Ernest Leon Westfield Sr. (November 30, 1939 – November 4, 2020) was an American right-handed pitcher in Negro league baseball between 1959 and 1965.

A native of Cleveland, Tennessee, Westfield made his Negro leagues debut in 1959 with the Birmingham Black Barons, and played for the club through 1965. At 6' 3" and 160 lbs., he batted and threw right-handed, and was the starting pitcher for the East in the 1960 East-West All-Star Game. Westfield died in Champaign, Illinois, on November 4, 2020, at age 80.

References

External links
 Ernest Westfield at Negro Leagues Baseball Museum

1939 births
2020 deaths
Birmingham Black Barons players
20th-century African-American sportspeople
21st-century African-American people